Virginia Ruano Pascual and Paola Suárez were the defending champions, but neither of them competed this year.

Květa Peschke and Francesca Schiavone won the title by defeating Svetlana Kuznetsova and Nadia Petrova 3–6, 7–6(7–1), 6–3 in the final.

Seeds

Draw

References
 Main and Qualifying draws

Dubai Tennis Championships - Doubles
2006 Dubai Tennis Championships